Viipuri Province (commonly abbreviated Vpl,  or Wiborgs län) was a historical province of Finland from 1812 to 1945.

History
The predecessor of the province was Vyborg Governorate, which was established in 1744 from territories ceded by the Swedish Empire to Russia in 1721 (Treaty of Nystad) and in 1743 (Treaty of Åbo). These territories originated as parts of the Viborg and Nyslott County and Kexholm County in 1721, and parts of the Savolax and Kymmenegård County in 1743. The governorate was also known as Old Finland.

During the Napoleonic Wars, the Kingdom of Sweden had allied itself with the Russian Empire, United Kingdom and other parties against Napoleonic France. However, following the Treaty of Tilsit in 1807, Russia made peace with France. In 1808, supported by France, Russia successfully challenged Swedish control over Finland in the Finnish War. In the Treaty of Fredrikshamn on September 17, 1809, Sweden was obliged to cede all its territory in Finland east of the Torne River to Russia. The ceded territories became a part of the Russian Empire and were reconstituted into the autonomic Grand Duchy of Finland, with the Russian Tsar as Grand Duke.

In 1812, the territories of the Vyborg Governorate were transferred from Russia proper to the Grand Duchy of Finland and established as Viipuri Province. The transfer announced by Tsar Alexander I just before Christmas, on December 23, 1811 O.S. (January 4, 1812 N.S.), can be seen as a symbolic gesture and an attempt to appease the sentiment of the Finnish population, which had just experienced Russian conquest of their country by force. Siestarjoki was transferred to Saint Petersburg Governorate in 1864.

When Finland became independent from Russia in 1917, the status of Viipuri Province remained unchanged. The provincial capital, Vyborg, was at this time the fourth largest city in Finland.

Viipuri Province had sided with the Finnish Socialist Workers' Republic during the Finnish Civil War. The Province was important to Red Finland for the reason that it shared a border with the Russian SFSR which in turn could send troops and supplies to Red Finland.

World War II

On September 1, 1939, Nazi Germany invaded Poland and started World War II. On September 17, 1939, the USSR, in accordance with the secret protocols of the Molotov–Ribbentrop Pact, invaded Poland from the east. Within months, the Soviet Union launched a war against Finland. As a result of this war, Finland was forced to cede territory, including parts of Viipuri Province, to the Soviet Union in the Moscow Peace Treaty in early 1940. Finland lost its natural border along the Rajajoki River in the south.  22,973 km2, or 71.5 percent of the province on the Karelian Isthmus, including the cities of Viipuri and Sortavala, became part of the newly established Karelo-Finnish SSR in the Soviet Union. Following the peace treaty, the entire population of the ceded territories, more than four hundred thousand people, was evacuated to central Finland.

In 1941 the Continuation War broke out and Finland recaptured the territories, but in 1944 its forces were pushed back and by the Moscow Armistice on September 19, 1944, and the Paris Peace Treaty in 1947 the territorial losses were confirmed again.

Winter war evacuees had returned following the Finnish offensive in 1941 and were evacuated again in 1944 after the Soviet counterattack, and the territories were repopulated by people from other parts of the Soviet Union. This time, the Karelian Isthmus became part of the Vyborgsky and Priozersky districts of the Leningrad Oblast, and only Ladoga Karelia and Border Karelia became part of the Karelo-Finnish SSR.

While Ladoga Karelia retained most of its original toponyms, the vast majority of toponyms in the Karelian Isthmus were renamed by the Soviet government around 1948. In 1945 the parts of the province that remained in Finnish hands were renamed Kymi Province, with its center at Kouvola. The Kymi Province was in turn merged with other provinces into the larger Southern Finland Province in 1997.

Maps

Economy

The area had a well-developed economy due to its proximity to Saint Petersburg, the capital of the Russian Empire.
In 1856 Saimaa Canal (Saymensky kanal) was opened, linking Lake Saimaa and Finnish Lakeland to the Vyborg Bay.

The development of the province was bolstered further by the construction of the Saint Petersburg–Riihimäki railroad in 1870, the Viborg–Joensuu railroad in 1894 and the Petrograd–Hiitola railroad in 1917.

Granite, marble (in Ruskeala) and bog iron mining as well as logging were important branches of industry. Starting from the beginning of the 20th century, a number of hydroelectric power plants were built by Enso in the higher reaches of the River Vuoksi to supply its pulp and paper mills.

Administrative divisions

Local districts

In Finnish kihlakunta, in Swedish härad.

Ranta 
Äyräpää 
Käkisalmi 
Kurkijoki  now usually transliterated into English as Kurkiyoki (Куркиёки)
Kymi 
Lappee 
Salmi 
Sortavala 
Jääski .

Cities, towns and municipalities in 1939

Those which were ceded to the Soviet Union during World War II are given in italics.

Cities

Hamina - Fredrikshamn
Kotka
Käkisalmi - Kexholm
Lappeenranta - Villmanstrand (website)
Sortavala - Sordavala (website)
Viipuri - Viborg (website 1, website 2)

Towns

 Kouvola
Koivisto - Björkö (website)
Lahdenpohja (website)
Lauritsala (merged into Lappeenranta in 1967)

Rural municipalities

Finnish/Swedish name. Main village with the same name unless otherwise noted.

Antrea - S:t Andree (website)
Haapasaari - Aspö (merged into Kotka in 1974)
Harlu (website)
Heinjoki (website)
Hiitola (website)
Impilahti - Impilax (website)
Jaakkima (website)
Johannes (website) - S:t Johannes
Joutseno (merged into Lappeenranta in 2009 (website)
Jääski - Jäskis (partially lost, the rest incorporated into Imatra, Joutseno and Ruokolahti in 1948)
Kanneljärvi (website)
Kaukola (website)
Kirvu - Kirvus (website)
Kivennapa - Kivinebb (website)
Koiviston maalaiskunta - Björkö landkommun (Koivisto rural commune) (website)
Korpiselkä (partially lost, the rest incorporated into Tuupovaara in 1946) ( website)
Kuolemajärvi (website)
Kurkijoki - Kronoborg (website)
Kymi - Kymmene (merged into Kotka in 1977)
Käkisalmen maalaiskunta - Kexholms landkommun (Käkisalmi rural commune)
Lappee (merged into Lappeenranta in 1967) - Lappvesi
Lavansaari - Lövskär (website)
Lemi - Klemis
Lumivaara (website)
Luumäki
Metsäpirtti (website)
Miehikkälä
Muolaa - Mohla (Kyyrölä merged into Muolaa in 1934) (website)
Nuijamaa (merged into Lappeenranta in 1989)
Parikkala (website)
Pyhtää - Pyttis
Pyhäjärvi (website)
Rautjärvi (website)
Rautu - Rautus (website)
Ruokolahti - Ruokolax (website)
Ruskeala
Räisälä (website)
Saari (merged into Parikkala in 2005) (website)
Sakkola (website)
Salmi - Salmis (website)
Savitaipale
Seiskari - Seitskär
Simpele (merged into  Rautjärvi in 1973)
Sippola (merged into Anjalankoski in 1975)
Soanlahti
Sortavalan maalaiskunta - Sordavala landkommun (Sortavala rural commune)
Suistamo (website)
Suojärvi (website)
Suomenniemi
Suursaari - Hogland
Säkkijärvi (partially lost, the rest incorporated into Miehikkälä and Ylämaa in 1946)
Taipalsaari
Terijoki (website)
Tytärsaari - Tytärskär
Uukuniemi (merged into Parikkala in 2005) (website)
Uusikirkko - Nykyrka (website)
Vahviala (partially lost, the rest incorporated into Lappee and Ylämaa in 1946)
Valkeala (merged into Kouvola in 2009
Valkjärvi (website)
Vehkalahti - Veckelax (merged into Hamina in 2003)
Viipurin maalaiskunta - Viborgs landkommun (Viipuri rural commune)
Virolahti - Vederlax (website)
Vuoksela (website)
Vuoksenranta
Ylämaa  (merged into Lappeenranta in 2010 (website)
Äyräpää (main village - Pölläkkälä)

Electoral districts

Following the electoral reform to the new Parliament of Finland in 1906, the province was divided into an Eastern and a Western electoral district.

Western electoral district

Haapasaari, Hamina, Johannes, Kanneljärvi, Koivisto, Koiviston maalaiskunta, Kotka, Kouvola, Kuolemajärvi, Kymi, Lappee, Lappeenranta, Lauritsala, Lavansaari, Lemi, Luumäki, Miehikkälä, Nuijamaa, Pyhtää, Savitaipale, Seiskari, Sippola, Suomenniemi, Suursaari, Säkkijärvi, Taipalsaari, Tytärsaari, Uusikirkko, Vahviala, Valkeala, Vehkalahti, Viipuri, Viipurin maalaiskunta, Virolahti, Ylämaa

Eastern electoral district

Antrea, Harlu, Heinjoki, Hiitola, Impilahti, Jaakkima, Joutseno, Jääski, Kaukola, Kirvu, Kivennapa, Korpiselkä, Kurkijoki, Käkisalmen maalaiskunta, Käkisalmi, Lahdenpohja, Lumivaara, Metsäpirtti, Muolaa, Parikkala, Pyhäjärvi, Rautjärvi, Rautu, Ruokolahti, Ruskeala, Räisälä, Sakkola, Salmi, Simpele, Soanlahti, Sortavala, Sortavalan maalaiskunta, Suistamo, Suojärvi, Terijoki, Uukuniemi, Valkjärvi, Vuoksela, Vuoksenranta, Äyräpää

Gallery

Governors
Governors of the Viipuri Province 1812-1945:

 Carl Johan Stjernvall 1812-1815
 Carl Johan Walleen 1816-1820
 Otto Wilhelm Klinckowström 1820-1821 (acting) and 1821-1825
 Carl August Ramsay 1825-1827 (acting) and 1827–1834
 Carl Gustaf Mannerheim 1834-1839
 Fredric Stewen 1839-1844
 Casimir von Kothen 1844-1846 (acting) and 1846–1853
 Alexander Thesleff 1853-1856
 Bernhard Indrenius 1856-1866
 Christian Theodor Åker-Blom 1866-1882
 Woldemar von Daehn 1882-1885
 Sten Carl Tudeer 1885-1888 (acting) and 1888–1889
 Johan Axel Gripenberg 1889-1899
 Nikolai von Rechenberg 1900-1902
 Nikolai Mjasojedov 1902-1905
 Konstantin Kazansky 1905 (acting) and 1905
 Mikael von Medem 1905-1906 (acting)
 Nikolai von Rechenberg 1906-1907
 Birger Gustaf Samuel von Troil 1907-1910
 Frans Carl Fredrik Josef von Pfaler 1910-1917
 Vilho Sarkanen (acting) 1917
 Valfrid Suhonen (acting) 1917-1918
 Antti Hackzell 1918-1920
 Lauri Kristian Relander 1920-1925
 Arvo Manner 1925-1945

Both the second President of Finland Lauri Kristian Relander and Carl Gustaf Mannerheim, grandfather of the sixth President, Carl Gustaf Emil Mannerheim, were governors of Viipuri province.

Notable people

People born in Viipuri Province between 1812 and 1917, when it was part of the Grand Duchy of Finland

Carl Jaenisch (1813–1872) Finnish and Russian chess player and theorist
Stephen Wäkevä (1833 in Säkkijärvi - 1910) Russian silversmith of Finnish origin, Fabergé workmaster
Julius Krohn (1835, Viipuri - 1888) Finnish poetry researcher, professor of Finnish literature and Fennoman
Leo Mechelin (1839 in Hamina – 1914) Finnish professor, statesman, senator and liberal reformer
Kaarlo Bergbom (1843, Viipuri – 1906) theatre director, founded the Finnish National Theatre
Lydia Sesemann (1845–1925) Finnish doctor of chemistry
Alexandra Gripenberg (1857, Kurkiyoki [Finnish Kurkijoki] - 1913) Finnish social activist, newspaper publisher and Fennoman
Ernst Löfström (1865–1937) Finnish general
Gustaf Komppa (1867, Viipuri – 1949), Finnish chemist
Armas Järnefelt (1869, Viipuri – 1958), Finnish composer and conductor
Magnus Enckell (1870 in Hamina – 1925) Finnish symbolist painter
Georg Schnéevoigt (1872–1947) Finnish conductor and cellist
Hugo Simberg (1873–1917) Finnish symbolist painter and graphic artist.
Erkki Melartin (1875 in Käkisalmi – 1937) Finnish composer
Ernst Mielck (1877 in Viipuri – 1899), Finnish composer
Onni Talas (1877 in Lappeenranta — 1958) Finnish lawyer, politician, professor and diplomat 
Aino Kallas (1878 in Kiiskilä – 1956) Finnish-Estonian author of novellas
Uno Ullberg (1879, Viipuri – 1944), Finnish architect
Lauri Kristian Relander (1883, Kurkiyoki – 1942), second President of Finland
Kersti Bergroth (1886–1975) Finnish author and playwright.
Algoth Niska (1888, Viipuri – 1954), a Finnish bootlegger, footballer and adventurer
Juho Niukkanen (1888 in Kirvu – 1954), Finnish minister
Karl Lennart Oesch (1892 in Pyhäjärvi – 1978), Finnish general
Elsa Arokallio (1892 in Kurkiyoki - 1982) Finnish architect
Edwin Linkomies (1894, Viipuri – 1963), Prime Minister of Finland
Väinö Kunnas (1896-1929) Finnish Expressionist painter
Saara Ranin (1898 in Hamina – 1992) Finnish actress and director
Tyyne Leivo-Larsson (1902 in Uusikirkko – 1977) Finnish Ambassador and MP
Cay Sundström (1902 in Hamina - 1959) Finnish dentist, politician and diplomat
Simo Häyhä (born 1905, Rautjärvi - 2002), Finnish soldier
Helvi Hämäläinen (1907 in Hamina – 1998) Finnish author, published prose and poetry
Viljo Vesterinen (1907 in Terijoki – 1961) Finnish accordionist and composer.
Sam Vanni (1908–1992) Finnish painter, pioneer of abstract art
Veikko Lavi (1912 in Kotka – 1996) Finnish singer, songwriter and author
Harry Lindblad (1912–1984) President of the Finnish Ice Hockey Association
Armi Ratia (1912 Pälkjärvi – 1979) founder of the Finnish textile and clothing company Marimekko
Sylvi Saimo  (1914 in Jaakkima – 2004) Finnish sprint canoeist, gold medalist, 1952 Summer Olympics
Wassily Hoeffding (1914 in Mustamäki – 1991) Finnish statistician and probabilist
Johannes Virolainen (1914 near Viipuri - 2000), 30th Prime Minister of Finland
Masa Niemi (1914, Viipuri – 1960) drummer, actor and comedian
Mikhail Bogdanov (1914–1995) a Soviet production designer
Ester Toivonen (1914 in Hamina — 1979) Miss Finland in 1933, Miss Europe 1934, then film star
Erna Tauro (1916–1993) Finnish-Swedish pianist and composer

For people born after 1917 in Vyborg

See also
Fief of Viborg (1320–1534)
Viborg and Nyslott County and Kexholm County (1634–1721)
Karelian Isthmus for the present-day region, which once was the heartland of the province

Further reading

External links
Luovutettu Karjala- Ceded Karelia. Website
Sopanen, Olli-Matti. Viipurin läänin historiallinen bibliografia, 1812-1944 Temaattinen kirjallisuusluettelo Suomen autonomian ja itsenäisyyden ajan Viipurin lääniä käsittelevistä teoksista. University of Joensuu, 2004.
Knipovich, Nikolay. Vyborg gubernia. Brockhaus and Efron Encyclopedic Dictionary.
История селений. ИКО "Карелия"

History of the Karelian Isthmus
History of Vyborg
Provinces of Finland (1917–97)
Viipuri
1812 establishments in the Russian Empire